Jörgen Ola Pettersson (born 29 September 1975) is a Swedish former professional footballer who played as a striker. Starting his career with Malmö FF in 1991, he went on to represent Borussia Mönchengladbach, 1. FC Kaiserslautern, and Copenhagen before retiring at Landskrona BoIS in 2008. A full international between 1995 and 2002, he won 27 caps and scored 8 goals for the Sweden national team and was a part of their UEFA Euro 2000 squad.

Club career
Pettersson started his career in Dösjöbro IF, and has since played for Kävlinge GIF, Malmö FF, Borussia Mönchengladbach, 1. FC Kaiserslautern, FC København and Landskrona BoIS in his home country. In February 2009, Pettersson retired from the professional football and has since May 2009 been playing for the Swedish Division 4 club Häljarps IF.

International career

Youth 
Having represented the Sweden U17, U19, and U21 teams, Pettersson was part of the Sweden U21 team that finished sixth at the 1998 UEFA European Under-21 Championship.

Senior 
Pettersson made his senior debut for Sweden on 16 August 1995 in a friendly game against the USA. He scored his first international goal two months later, in a friendly game against Scotland on 11 October 1995. He made his competitive debut for Sweden on 15 November 1995 against Turkey in a UEFA Euro 1996 qualifier, scoring a goal in a 2–2 draw. Two years later, Pettersson represented Sweden at UEFA Euro 2000, appearing in the group stage games against Belgium and Turkey as Sweden failed to advance from their group.

Pettersson made his last international appearance on 16 October 2002, scoring a goal as Sweden lost 3–2 to Portugal in a friendly. In total, he won 27 caps for Sweden, scoring 8 goals.

Coaching career
Pettersson was appointed as one of the three new assistant managers at Malmö FF on 29 October 2011 ahead of the 2012 season along with Daniel Andersson and Simon Hollyhead. On 16 November 2012, Pettersson was appointed manager in Superettan club Landskrona BoIS, replacing Henrik Larsson.

Personal life
In 2001 Pettersson was involved in a car accident on the German autobahn A63 near Wörrstadt. He crashed his Mercedes into a minicar with such velocity the 20-year old driver of said car died instantly. Seconds prior to the fatal crash the minicar presumably was involved in a minor collision which led it to spin out of control.

Career statistics 

Scores and results list Sweden's goal tally first, score column indicates score after each Pettersson goal.

References

1975 births
Living people
Association football forwards
Swedish footballers
Sweden international footballers
Sweden under-21 international footballers
Sweden youth international footballers
Malmö FF players
F.C. Copenhagen players
Landskrona BoIS players
1. FC Kaiserslautern players
Borussia Mönchengladbach players
Danish Superliga players
Allsvenskan players
Bundesliga players
Expatriate footballers in Germany
Expatriate men's footballers in Denmark
UEFA Euro 2000 players
Swedish football managers
Landskrona BoIS managers
Högaborgs BK managers